The N86 road is a national secondary road in County Kerry, Ireland. It runs from Tralee (Castlemaine Road Roundabout on the N22/N69 Tralee Bypass) to Dingle and passes through Annascaul and Lispole en route and passes by Gallaunmore. It has, in recent years, seen significant improvements to certain stretches of road.

References

Roads Act 1993 (Classification of National Roads) Order 2006 – Department of Transport

National secondary roads in the Republic of Ireland
Roads in County Kerry